The San Juan Formation is a geologic formation in Mexico. It preserves fossil corals dating back to the Lutetian stage of the Paleogene period.

See also

 List of fossiliferous stratigraphic units in Mexico

References 

Geologic formations of Mexico
Paleogene Mexico
Limestone formations